Sarah Lam is a British-Chinese actress known for UK television roles.

Career 
She played Susannah in the sitcom No Problem!, Linda Mo in Angels, Anna Lee in Howards' Way and Caroline Choi in Brookside. Other TV credits include Two Thousand Acres of Sky, Q.E.D., The Chinese Detective, C.A.T.S. Eyes, A Very Peculiar Practice, The Adventure Game, To Be the Best, Virtual Murder, Sherlock, Inspector Morse, The Bill and Holby City.

Lam has recently been involved in the production The World of Extreme Happiness at the National Theatre.

In 2015, Lam appeared in an episode of Casualty. She also appeared in The Secret Diary of Adrian Mole as a nurse and the 80s cult show The Adventure Game.

Lam appeared in Paradise, Kae Tempest's new all-female version of Sophocles' play Philoctetes, Postponed from 2020, it was directed by Ian Rickson with Lesley Sharp as the title character.

Filmography

Film

Television

Video games

References

External links
 
 Sarah Lam entry on TV.com

British television actresses
Living people
Year of birth missing (living people)